Scare tactics may refer to:

 Scare tactics, or fear mongering, the tactical use of fear, fright, or terror
 Scare Tactics, a 2003–2013 American hidden-camera pranks television series
 Scare Tactics (comic), a 1996–1998 DC Comics mini-series.